Republic of the Congo may refer to:

 Republic of the Congo, the country also known as Congo-Brazzaville (1960–present)
 People's Republic of the Congo, a socialist state in the Republic of the Congo (1969–1992)
 Democratic Republic of the Congo, the country also known as Congo-Kinshasa (1997–present), formerly known as Zaire.
 Republic of the Congo (Léopoldville), an antecedent of the present Democratic Republic of the Congo, also known as Congo-Léopoldville (1960–1971)
 Free Republic of the Congo, a rival government of Congo-Léopoldville, also known as Congo-Stanleyville (1960–1962)
 People's Republic of the Congo, a rival government of Congo-Léopoldville declared by the Simba rebellion (1963–1965)